LHP may refer to:
 Left-hand path,  a term used in the Western esotericism
 Loop heat pipe, a two-phase heat transfer device
 Lego Harry Potter, a Lego theme based on the films of the Harry Potter series
 Lighthouse Point, Florida, a city in Broward County, Florida, United States
 Lighthouse Point, Bahamas, a private peninsula in Eleuthera, Bahamas
 Left-handed pitcher in baseball
 Lake Highland Preparatory School, a private school in Orlando, Florida
 LOHAS Park station, Hong Kong (MTR station code LHP)